Binod Kumar Shah is a Nepalese politician. In the 1994 election he was elected to the Pratinidhi Sabha as the candidate of the Nepal Workers Peasants Party from the Dailekh-2 constituency. Shah won with 13640 votes against 6725 votes for Ranga Bahadur Shahi of the Nepali Congress. Shah later joined the Communist Party of Nepal (Unified Marxist-Leninist) along with his entire team in the districts of Bheri and Karnali zones, which caused a rift between NWPP and CPN(UML). In July 2005, he was appointed Assistant Minister for Water Resource by King Gyanendra. Now, he has been engaging in politics of Nepal being as a Central Committee member of Nepal Communist Party.

References

Government ministers of Nepal
Living people
Nepal Workers Peasants Party politicians
Communist Party of Nepal (Unified Marxist–Leninist) politicians
Year of birth missing (living people)
Nepal MPs 1994–1999
Members of the Provincial Assembly of Karnali Province